Davis Wright Tremaine LLP is an American business and litigation law firm. Founded in 1944, the firm is a limited liability partnership and employs over 500 lawyers. Davis Wright Tremaine is headquartered in Seattle, Washington, and has offices in seven other cities in the United States.

History

Davis Wright Tremaine was founded in Seattle, Washington, in 1944.

In 1944, founder John Davis outlined the "real aims" of the firm in a series of hand-written notes which included financial independence, "good reputation among fellow men, especially for ability and integrity"; and "enough time off to enjoy living." The firm merged with Wright, Simon, Todd & Schmechel in 1969. In the 1980s, the firm opened offices in Anchorage, Alaska; Washington, D.C.; Bellevue, Washington; and Los Angeles, California. It merged with Ragen, Tremaine, Krieger of Portland, Oregon, in 1990 and added more than 20 lawyers from Heller Ehrman LLP in 2008.

In 1993, the Ministry of Justice of the People's Republic of China selected Davis Wright Tremaine to be the first United States firm to open a law office in Shanghai. The Shanghai office closed in 2018.

Alumni of the firm include Gary Locke, who is the former Governor of Washington state and served as U.S. Secretary of Commerce and U.S. Ambassador to China during the Obama Administration.

Notable cases
The firm served as lead counsel for 30,000 plaintiffs in consolidated proceedings on behalf of fishermen, processors, Alaska natives, landowners, businesses, and others injured as a result of the spill of 11.8 million gallons of North Slope crude oil into the coastal waters of Alaska by the Exxon Valdez. The plaintiffs were ultimately awarded almost a billion dollars in damages and interest.

The firm also successfully represented CBS in its long-running effort to overturn fines imposed by the Federal Communications Commission over the Janet Jackson's "wardrobe malfunction" at the 2004 Super Bowl.

Assistance to Guantanamo captives
Charles "Cully" Stimson, then Deputy Assistant Secretary of Defense for Detainee Affairs, stirred controversy when he went on record criticizing the patriotism of law firms that allowed employees to assist Guantanamo captives: "corporate CEOs seeing this should ask firms to choose between lucrative retainers and representing terrorists." Stimson's views were widely criticized; the Pentagon disavowed them, and Stimson resigned shortly thereafter.

2009 Sunwest malpractice suit
In 2009, investors in retirement home operator Sunwest Management Inc. sued Davis Wright Tremaine, alleging that it played a key role in assisting in its running of a $400 million Ponzi scheme. The lawsuit alleged that Davis Wright Tremaine encouraged individuals and businesses to invest in Sunwest, even though they were aware of the company's financial troubles. Davis Wright Tremaine's involvement in the suit was resolved before trial, when the firm agreed to pay a $30 million settlement to the plaintiffs, one of the largest malpractice settlements by a law firm accused of securities wrongdoing in Oregon history.  As of Davis Wright Tremaine's settlement, investor claims remained against Sunwest law firms K&L Gates and Thompson & Knight (now part of Holland & Knight).

Accolades
In 2012, Davis Wright was ranked the 96th largest law firm in the United States by the National Law Journal, based on attorney headcount. The firm was ranked No. 114 by gross revenue on the AmLaw 200 that same year. The firm received Band 1 rankings in the 2016 Chambers USA guide to America's Leading Lawyers for Business in 13 practice areas across five states, including Corporate/M&A, Commercial Litigation, Energy, Labor & Employment, Media & Entertainment, and Real Estate. The firm was again high in the rankings for First Amendment Litigation – Nationwide, with more lawyers ranked nationally than any firm in the country. The media practice group is widely recognized as a national leader. The firm's team of 70 media lawyers was honored in 2013 with the Chambers USA Award for Excellence, designating Davis Wright as the firm that "has excelled above all others" in this practice area. In 2012, Davis Wright was named Law Firm of the Year in the Communications practice area by Best Lawyers and U.S. News.

References

External links
 

Law firms established in the 20th century
Law firms based in Seattle
Intellectual property law firms
1944 establishments in Washington (state)